William Varty (25 June 1906 – 1965) was an English footballer of the 1930s.  He played professionally for Blackpool, Gillingham, Gateshead and Carlisle United.  He made 33 Football League appearances.

References

People from Throckley
Footballers from Tyne and Wear
English footballers
Blackpool F.C. players
Gateshead F.C. players
Carlisle United F.C. players
Gillingham F.C. players
Association football outside forwards
1906 births
1965 deaths